Ib Michael (born 1945 in Roskilde, Denmark) is a Danish novelist and poet. His writing style has been described as magic realism.

He attended the University of Copenhagen, where he studied Central American and Indian Language and Culture. Michael is the author of the works "Kejserfortællingen" (The Tiger's Tale), "Kilroy, Kilroy", "Vanillepigen" (The Vanilla Girl), "Den tolvte rytter" (The Midnight Soldier), "Brev til månen" (Letter to the Moon), and "Prins" (Prince). He has won numerous awards, including the Otto Gelsted Prize in 1978, The Booksellers Club Golden Laurel in 1990, The Danish Author Association Peace Prize in 1991, and the Grand Prize of the Danish Academy in 1994.

Bibliography 
 En hidtil uset drøm om skibe (1970)
 Den flyvende kalkundræber (1971)
 Warum ist die Banane so krumm (radio drama, 1973)
 Indianerliv i regnskoven (together with Per Kirkeby and Teit Jørgensen, 1973)
 Mayalandet (together with Per Kirkeby og Teit Jørgensen, 1973)
 Hjortefod (1974)
 Popol Vuh – Quiché-mayaernes Folkebog (1975)
 Den udødelige soldat (radio drama in 4 episodes, 1976)
 Rejsen tilbage (1977)
 Rejsen til det grønne firben (memoir, 1980)
 Snedronningen (1981)
 Kejserfortællingen (1981)
 Troubadourens lærling (1984)
 Himmelbegravelse (poems, 1986)
 Sonde (radio drama, 1987)
 Hajskygger (1988)
 Kilroy, Kilroy (1989)
 Vinden i metroen (poems, 1990)
 Vanillepigen (1991)
 Glæden ved at dykke (1993)
 Den tolvte rytter (1993)
 Det lukkede øje (1994)
 Brev til månen (1995)
 Prins (1997)
 Atkinsons biograf – en vandrehistorie (short stories, 1998)
 Rosa Mundi (poems, 2000)
 Mit år (diary, 2000)
 Kejserens Atlas (2001)
 Paven af Indien (2003)
 Grill (2005)
 Blå bror (2006)
 Sorte huller (2007)
 Vilde Engle (2009)

Honour 
 1970, 1974, 1977, 1983, 1985, 1989 Statens Kunstfond, Travel grant
 1978 Otto Gelsted Prize
 1979 Gyldendals boglegat
 1985 Otto Benzons Forfatterlegat
 1985 Jeanne og Henri Nathansens Fødselsdagslegat
 1987 Henrik Pontoppidans Mindefonds Legat
 1989 Literature Prize of Weekendavisen
 1990 De Gyldne Laurbær
 1991 Drassows Legat
 1991 Danish Critics Prize for Literature
 1993 Søren Gyldendal Prize
 1994 Grand Prize of the Danish Academy
 1995 Bog & Idé Prisen
 2010 Ridderkorset af Dannebrogordenen (Order of the Dannebrog, 16 April)
 2017 Drachmannlegatet

References

External links
 Ib Michael at PEN World Voices Festival in New York City with Gabriela Adamesteanu and Giannina Braschi open source video

1945 births
People from Roskilde
Living people
Postmodern writers
Recipients of the Grand Prize of the Danish Academy
Danish male novelists
20th-century Danish novelists
20th-century Danish male writers